The 2021–22 Boston College Eagles women's basketball team represented Boston College during the 2021–22 NCAA Division I women's basketball season. The Eagles were led by fourth year head coach Joanna Bernabei-McNamee. They played their home games at the Conte Forum and were members of the Atlantic Coast Conference.

The Eagles finished the season 21–12 overall and 10–8 in ACC play to finish in a three way tie for seventh place. As the eighth seed in the ACC tournament, they lost to Florida State in the First Round.

Previous season

The Eagles finished the season 7–12 and 2–11 in ACC play to finish in a thirteenth place.  In the ACC tournament, they defeated Pittsburgh in the First Round before losing to Syracuse in the Second Round.  They were not invited to the NCAA tournament or the WNIT.

Off-season

Departures

Incoming transfers

Recruiting class

Source:

Roster

Schedule

Source:

|-
!colspan=9 style=| Regular season

|-
!colspan=9 style=| ACC Women's Tournament

|-
!colspan=9 style=| WNIT

Rankings

Coaches did not release a Week 2 poll and AP does not release a poll after the NCAA Tournament.

See also
 2021–22 Boston College Eagles men's basketball team

References

Boston College Eagles women's basketball seasons
Boston College
Boston College Eagles women's basketball
Boston College Eagles women's basketball
Boston College Eagles women's basketball
Boston College Eagles women's basketball
Boston College